G. V. Markandayan is an Indian politician and Current member of the Tamil Nadu Legislative Assembly from the Vilathikulam constituency representing DMK. He also served as MLA during 2011-2016 from the same Vilathikulam constituency .He represented the Anna Dravida Munnetra Kazhagam party during that period.

AIADMK party denied ticket for him in the Tamil Nadu Legislative Assembly by-election, 2019-2020, hence he turned rebel and contesting as an Independent politician in Vilathikulam constituency and resigned as AIADMK spokesman. After his independent nomination, AIADMK party chiefs expelled him from the party membership permanently.His enormous fame got him vast 28000 votes independently.
He joined DMK and contested in the 2021 Assembly Elections and retained his  Vilathikulam constituency after a gap of 5 years.He won by a margin of 40,000 votes defeating the AIADMK candidate.
.

He runs Ambal educational trust and Ambal Kosalai.

References 

Living people
1977 births
Tamil Nadu MLAs 2021–2026
Dravida Munnetra Kazhagam politicians
All India Anna Dravida Munnetra Kazhagam politicians